Pinto Battery, also known as Għżira Battery or Kechakara Battery, is a former artillery battery in Birżebbuġa, Malta. It was built by the Order of Saint John between 1715 and 1716 as one of a series of coastal fortifications around the coasts of the Maltese Islands. The battery has been heavily altered over time, and the blockhouse now houses a bar and a garage, while the gun platform and parapet have been largely destroyed, with only the general outline still visible.

History

Pinto Battery was built in 1715-1716 as part of the first building programme of coastal batteries in Malta. It was part of a chain of fortifications that defended Marsaxlokk Bay, which also included six other batteries, the large Saint Lucian Tower, two smaller De Redin towers, four redoubts and three entrenchments. Construction of the battery cost 1109 scudi.

The battery originally consisted of a semi-circular gun platform, with a parapet containing eight embrasures. Its gorge had a large rectangular blockhouse protected by a redan. The battery's entrance was located within the redan. It was originally armed with cannons.

Present day
The battery has undergone major alterations over time, being largely destroyed in the process. The redan has been destroyed, while the blockhouse is a bar and a garage. The general outline of the semi-circular gun platform can still be seen, although the parapet with embrasures no longer exists.

References

External links
National Inventory of the Cultural Property of the Maltese Islands

Batteries in Malta
Hospitaller fortifications in Malta
Military installations established in 1715
Birżebbuġa
Limestone buildings in Malta
National Inventory of the Cultural Property of the Maltese Islands
18th-century fortifications
1715 establishments in Malta
18th Century military history of Malta